The 2022 Perth SuperNight (know for commercial purpose as the 2022 Bunnings Trade Perth SuperNight) was a motor racing event held as a part of the 2022 Supercars Championship from Saturday 30 April to Sunday 1 May 2022. The event was held at the Barbagallo Raceway in Wanneroo, Western Australia. It was the fourth round of the 2022 Supercars Championship and consisted of three races of 110.906 kilometres each.

Results

Race 1

Race 2

Race 3

Championship standings after the race

Drivers' Championship standings

Teams'' Championship standings

 Note: Only the top five positions are included for standings.

References

Perth SuperNight
Perth SuperNight
Perth SuperNight